Government Polytechnic Bhaga, campus in BIT, is a college of mining engineering, computer engineering and food technology in Motinagar, Jharkhand. Established in 1905, Government Polytechnic Bhaga is considered the oldest college of mining engineering in Asia.  The studies of mining started earlier in 1887, before formal establishment.

See also
Education in India
Literacy in India
List of institutions of higher education in Jharkhand

References

External links

Schools of mines in India
Government universities and colleges in India
Universities and colleges in Jharkhand
Education in Dhanbad district